Bissen is a village in the Dutch province of Limburg.

Bissen is not a statistical entity, and the postal authorities have placed it under Mechelen. It has no place signs and consists about 20 houses.

References

Populated places in Limburg (Netherlands)
Gulpen-Wittem